Maung Rajan (born 5 March 1935) is a Burmese racewalker. He competed in the men's 50 kilometres walk at the 1964 Summer Olympics.

References

External links
 

1935 births
Living people
Athletes (track and field) at the 1964 Summer Olympics
Burmese male racewalkers
Olympic athletes of Myanmar
Place of birth missing (living people)